Brian William Barnes (3 June 1945 – 9 September 2019) was a professional golfer. He won nine times on the European Tour between 1972 and 1981 and twice won the Senior British Open.

Barnes played in six consecutive Ryder Cup matches from 1969 to 1979. He was noted for having beaten Jack Nicklaus twice in one day in singles match play, during the 1975 Ryder Cup on 21 September, winning 4&2 in the morning round and 2&1 in the afternoon session.

Early life and amateur career
Barnes was born in Addington, Surrey, England, by Scottish parents, and represented England at international level. Barnes was educated at St. Dunstan's School, Burnham-on-Sea, and Millfield School in Somerset.

Barnes was taught golf by his father who was Secretary at Burnham and Berrow Golf Club. He won the British Youths Open Amateur Championship in 1964, having represented England in the youth international against Scotland that preceded the championship. He turned professional soon afterwards.

Professional career
Barnes became one of the "Butten boys", a group of young British professional golfers who were part of a training programme, funded by Ernest Butten, an entrepreneur and joint founder of PA Consulting Group. Starting in 1963, Butten had funded a residential golf school at Sundridge Park in Bromley, Kent. Max Faulkner was employed as the teaching professional.

After turning professional Barnes continued to be considered an English golfer, representing England in the 1967 R.T.V. International Trophy. In 1971 he joined the Scottish PGA and subsequently played for Scotland in international competitions.

Barnes won the Flame Lily Open in Rhodesia in March 1967 and won two British tournaments, the Agfa-Gevaert Tournament and the Coca-Cola Young Professionals' Championship, in 1969. In 1970 he won the Wills Masters in Australia.

Barnes was one of the leading European Tour golfers in the early years after the tour was founded in 1972. He placed between 4th and 8th on the Order of Merit every year from 1972 to 1980. He won nine events on the Tour between 1972 and 1981. He also played regularly on the African Safari Circuit, winning the Zambia Open in 1979 and the Kenya Open and Zambia Open in 1981.

Barnes completed all four rounds of the Open Championship 16 times in succession from 1967 to 1982 and had three top ten finishes, the best of them a tie for fifth in 1972. He played in the Masters Tournament in 1972 and 1973 but missed the cut on both occasions.

Barnes played for Great Britain & Ireland and finally Europe in six consecutive Ryder Cup matches from 1969 to 1979. He has a 10–14–1 win–loss–tie record including a 5–5–0 record in singles matches (there were two sets of singles matches in some of the Ryder Cups in which he participated). He had a successful partnership with Bernard Gallacher in foursomes and four-ball matches, the pair having 5 wins and a half in their 10 matches playing together. He is, however, best remembered for beating Jack Nicklaus twice in one day in 1975.

After the 1984 season, when Barnes fell to 79th on the Order of Merit ranking, he only played a few tournaments the following year and retired to run a golf course in Sussex, England together with Max Faulkner; West Chillington. He made a semi-comeback in 1989 and played a full schedule of 25 tournaments, 46 years old, in 1991, reaching a 4th place finish at the Portuguese Open and finished 12th at the British Masters.

In 1995, Barnes became eligible to play in senior tournaments, and was very successful. He won the Senior British Open Championship in 1995 and became the first man to successfully defend the title in 1996. He topped the European Seniors Tour Order of Merit in 1995, and went on the play the Champions Tour in the late 1990s with moderate success. Arthritis hampered his career and forced him to leave tournament golf in 2000.

Barnes was responsible for one of the worst putting performances ever seen in a professional tournament. During the 1968 French Open, Barnes missed a short putt on the par-3 8th hole. Angry with the miss, he then tried to rake the ball into the cup, but missed. He then hit the ball back and forth while it was still moving. After all of the missed putts and penalty strokes were counted, Barnes had scored a 15 for the hole.

Personal life
Barnes married Hilary Faulkner, the daughter of Max Faulkner, in 1968 and they had two children, Didi and Guy. Hilary died in 2014. After having heavy alcohol drinking habits during his life and golf career, in early 1993, he checked himself in for a successful drying-out period, remained sober and continued his golf career, two years later with great success in senior tournaments. Barnes died on 9 September 2019 of cancer at the age of 74, he was with his son and daughter at home.

Amateur wins
1964 British Youths Open Amateur Championship

Professional wins (26)

European Tour wins (9)

*Note: The 1974 Dutch Open was shortened to 54 holes due to rain.

European Tour playoff record (3–2)

Safari Circuit wins (3)

Australasian wins (1)
 1970 Wills Masters

Other wins (11)
1967 Flame Lily Open (Rhodesia)
1969 Agfa-Gevaert Tournament, Coca-Cola Young Professionals' Championship
1977 Skol Tournament
1978 Northern Open, Skol Tournament
1980 Skol Tournament
1981 Scottish Professional Championship
1982 Scottish Professional Championship
1985 Northern Open
1989 Wilson Club Professionals' Championship

Senior PGA Tour wins (3)

Senior PGA Tour playoff record (1–0)

European Senior Tour wins (2)

European Senior Tour playoff record (1–0)

Results in major championships

Note: Barnes only played in the Masters Tournament and The Open Championship.

CUT = missed the half-way cut
"T" indicates a tie for a place

Senior major championships

Wins (2)

1Defeated Murphy with an eagle on the third hole of a sudden-death playoff.

Results timeline

CUT = missed the halfway cut
"T" indicates a tie for a place

Team appearances
Ryder Cup (representing Great Britain and Ireland/Europe): 1969 (tie), 1971, 1973, 1975, 1977, 1979
World Cup (representing Scotland): 1974, 1975, 1976, 1977
R.T.V. International Trophy (representing England): 1967 (winners)
Double Diamond International (representing Scotland): 1972, 1973 (winners), 1974 (captain), 1975 (captain), 1976 (captain), 1977 (captain)
Marlboro Nations' Cup/Philip Morris International (representing Scotland): 1972, 1973 (winners), 1976
Sotogrande Match/Hennessy Cognac Cup (representing Great Britain and Ireland): 1974 (winners), 1976 (winners), 1978 (winners), 1980 (winners, captain)
PGA Cup (representing Europe): 1990

See also
Fall 1969 PGA Tour Qualifying School graduates
List of golfers with most European Tour wins

References

External links

Scottish male golfers
European Tour golfers
PGA Tour Champions golfers
European Senior Tour golfers
Winners of senior major golf championships
Ryder Cup competitors for Europe
People educated at Millfield
People from the London Borough of Croydon
People from Storrington
English people of Scottish descent
1945 births
2019 deaths